The Schürmann-Bau is an office building in the Gronau district of Bonn, completed in 2002. It's named after its architect Joachim Schürmann. The building houses the headquarters of the Deutsche Welle, after being originally planned as an office building for the members of the Bundestag. The construction site was heavily damaged in December 1993 by a flood of the Rhine river, since there was no existing flood control. In 1997, the damaged building was renovated with an estimated cost of nearly 700 million euros, and is considered one of the most expensive buildings in German post-war history.

Art 

Since September 2004, a series of art objects by international artists has been on display outside the building. These include "Fest für Neptun" by Sokari Douglas Camp, "Ich und der Hahn - Hören und Sehen" by Babak Saed and "Comunicación cruzada" by Manuel Marin.

Buildings and structures in Bonn